The AXA Building, at 205 S. 5th St. in Leavenworth, Kansas, was built in 1905.  It was listed on the National Register of Historic Places in 1972.

It is an ornate and two-and-a-half story red brick commercial building, with a  facade along Fifth Street.

It was designed by Leavenworth architect William B. Feth and built by contractor R. B. Yoakum.  Known originally as the Eppenscheid Building. it was built for Charles Espenscheid, a St. Louis investor.

It is Late Victorian in style.

According to a guide to Kansas architecture, the building "stands out among its neighbors because of the inventiveness of its highly articulated Neo-classical ornament, particularly along the cornice, at its second-story bay windows, and around the lobby entry."

References

National Register of Historic Places in Leavenworth County, Kansas
Buildings and structures completed in 1905
Commercial buildings on the National Register of Historic Places in Kansas